Grateful may refer to:

 Gratitude, an emotion

Albums
Grateful (Carpark North album), 2008
Grateful (Coko album) or the title song, 2006
Grateful (DJ Khaled album), 2017

Songs
"Grateful" (Edyta Górniak song), 2016
"Grateful" (Rita Ora song), 2014
"Grateful", by John Bucchino, 1998
"Grateful", by Neffex, 2018
"Grateful", by Plan B from Heaven Before All Hell Breaks Loose, 2018

See also
 Greatful, an album by Classified, 2016
 Ungrateful (disambiguation)
 Gratitude (disambiguation)